The 2002 IIHF World Championship was held between 26 April and 11 May 2002 in Gothenburg, Karlstad and Jönköping, Sweden.

It was the 66th annual event, and was run by the International Ice Hockey Federation (IIHF).

Qualification Tournament

Far Eastern Qualification for the tournament took place between October 15 and October 17, 2001 in Harbin, China.

All times local

Venues

Final tournament

In the first round, the top 3 teams from each group progressed to the Second Round, whilst the last placed team progressed to the consolation round.

First round

Group A

All times local

Group B

All times local

Group C

All times local

Group D

All times local

Second round

In the Second Round, the top 3 teams from each group progressed to the Final Round, whilst the bottom 2 teams are eliminated.

Group E

Tables and scores below include meetings between teams during the First Round.

Group F

Tables and scores below include meetings between teams during the First Round.

Consolation round 13-16 place

Group G

As the Far Eastern qualifier,  avoids relegation.

All times local

Final round

Quarterfinals

Semifinals

Match for third place

Final

Ranking and statistics

Tournament Awards
Best players selected by the directorate:
Best Goaltender:       Maxim Sokolov
Best Defenceman:       Daniel Tjärnqvist
Best Forward:          Niklas Hagman
Most Valuable Player:  Miroslav Šatan
Media All-Star Team:
Goaltender:  Maxim Sokolov
Defence:  Richard Lintner,  Thomas Rhodin
Forwards:  Peter Bondra,  Niklas Hagman,  Miroslav Šatan

Final standings
The final standings of the tournament according to IIHF:

Scoring leaders
List shows the top ten skaters sorted by points, then goals, then (fewer) games played.
Source: IIHF.com

Leading goaltenders
Only the top five goaltenders, based on save percentage, who have played 40% of their team's minutes are included in this list.
Source: IIHF.com

See also
IIHF World Championship

References
Official tournament page
Far east qualifier page

External links
 Official Website

 
IIHF World Championship
1
World championships
World
2002
April 2002 sports events in Europe
May 2002 sports events in Europe
International sports competitions in Gothenburg
Sports competitions in Karlstad
Sports competitions in Jönköping
2000s in Gothenburg